Lambda Canis Majoris (λ Canis Majoris) is a solitary, blue-white hued star in the constellation Canis Major. Lambda CMa is visible to the naked eye with an apparent visual magnitude of +4.48. Based upon an annual parallax shift of 7.70 mas as seen from Earth, this star is located about 424 light years from the Sun. At that distance, the visual magnitude is diminished by an extinction of 0.14 due to interstellar dust.

This is a B-type main-sequence star with a stellar classification of B4 V. The star is roughly 40 million years old, and is spinning with a projected rotational velocity of 102 km/s. It has about 5.7 times the mass of the Sun and is radiating 560 times the Sun's luminosity at an effective temperature of 16,300 K.

References

External links

B-type main-sequence stars
Canis Majoris, Lambda
Canis Major
Durchmusterung objects
045813
30788
2361